The 2024 New Hampshire Republican presidential primary will be held on February 13, 2024, as part of the Republican Party primaries for the 2024 presidential election. 22 delegates to the 2024 Republican National Convention will be allocated on a proportional basis. The New Hampshire primary will be the second contest in the nation, held a week after the Iowa caucus.

Background 
Donald Trump won the 2016 New Hampshire Republican primary with 35.2% of the vote, with closest opponent John Kasich coming in second with 15.7% of the vote. 

Exit polling by Edison Research concluded that Trump's 2016 primary victory could be credited to support among white voters without a college degree, as well as support from moderate voters.

Candidates 

Former president Trump and former South Carolina Governor and U.S. Ambassador to the United Nations Nikki Haley are the only main contenders to officially announce their candidacy so far, although Florida governor Ron DeSantis is widely expected to announce his candidacy as soon as May 2023. 

Former vice president Mike Pence is reportedly considering running for the Republican nomination. Other candidates considering a candidacy include New Hampshire Governor Chris Sununu, who commentators have described as a relative moderate.

Campaign 
In January 2023, Trump tapped outgoing New Hampshire Republican Party chair Stephen Stepanek to oversee his campaign's operations in the state.

Governor Sununu, who is considering a presidential candidacy, established a "Live Free or Die committee" in a run-up to a potential candidacy.

Endorsements

Polling

See also 
 2024 Republican Party presidential primaries
 2024 United States presidential election
 2024 United States presidential election in New Hampshire
 2024 United States elections

Notes 

Partisan clients

References 

 New Hampshire Republican primaries
Republican presidential primary
New Hampshire